Stafford Creek Corrections Center (SCCC) is a Washington State Department of Corrections state prison for men located in Aberdeen, Washington.  The facility opened in 2000, has an operating capacity of 1936 inmates, and supports a mix of minimum, medium, and maximum security levels.

Stafford is one of a number of Washington prisons with an environmental program developed in conjunction with The Evergreen State College.  Inmates plant gardens (though health code restrictions are still being reviewed, preventing the food from being utilized in the institution kitchen), help restore protected wetlands by raising seedlings in prison greenhouses, and similar programs.  Results include an annual cost savings of $200,000 at Stafford from recycling trash, which decreased the amount of trash being hauled away

Notable inmates
Allen Christopher Ivanov, perpetrator of the 2016 Mukilteo shooting.
DeWayne Lee Harris, serial killer originally incarcerated at Clallam Bay Corrections Center
Jesus Mezquia, convicted in the 1993 murder of Mia Zapata. Died in January 2021.

See also
List of law enforcement agencies in Washington (state)
List of United States state correction agencies
List of U.S. state prisons
List of Washington state prisons

References

Prisons in Washington (state)
Aberdeen, Washington
2000 establishments in Washington (state)
Buildings and structures in Grays Harbor County, Washington